Dalla is a genus of skippers in the family Hesperiidae.

Species
The following species are recognised in the genus Dalla:
 
Dalla agathocles (C. & R. Felder, 1867)
Dalla austini A.D. Warren, 2011
Dalla bubobon (Dyar, 1921)
Dalla caicus (Hewitson, 1868)
Dalla calaon (Hewitson, 1877)
Dalla cocha Evans, 1955
Dalla cola Bell, 1959
Dalla costala Evans, 1955
Dalla cupavia (Mabille, 1898)
Dalla curia Evans, 1955
Dalla cyprius (Mabille, 1898)
Dalla cypselus (C. & R. Felder, 1867)
Dalla dimidiatus (C. & R. Felder, 1867)
Dalla diraspes (Hewitson, 1877)
Dalla dividuum (Dyar, 1913)
Dalla dognini (Mabille, 1889)
Dalla dora Bell, 1947
Dalla epiphaneus (C. & R. Felder, [1867])
Dalla eryonas (Hewitson, 1877)
Dalla faula (Godman, [1900])
Dalla frater (Mabille, 1878)
Dalla freemani Warren, 1997
Dalla frontinia Evans, 1955
Dalla gelus (Mabille, 1898)
Dalla genes (Mabille, 1898)
Dalla geon (Mabille, 1898)
Dalla grovius (Mabille, 1898)
Dalla hesperioides (C. & R. Felder, [1867])
Dalla hilina (Butler, 1870)
Dalla huanca Evans, 1955
Dalla jelskyi (Erschoff, 1875)
Dalla kemneri Steinhauser, 1991
Dalla lalage (Godman, [1900])
Dalla lenda Evans, 1955
Dalla lethaea (Schaus, 1913)
Dalla ligilla (Hewitson, 1877)
Dalla lorda Evans, 1955
Dalla mentor Evans, 1955
Dalla merida Evans, 1955
Dalla mesoxantha (Plötz, 1884)
Dalla miser Evans, 1955
Dalla nona Evans, 1955
Dalla nubes Steinhauser, 1991
Dalla octomaculata (Godman, [1900])
Dalla orsines (Hewitson, 1877)
Dalla oxaites (Hewitson, 1877)
Dalla pincha Steinhauser, 1991
Dalla polycrates (C. & R. Felder, 1867)
Dalla pota Bell, 1959
Dalla pulchra (Godman, [1900])
Dalla quasca Bell, 1947
Dalla ramirezi Freeman, 1969
Dalla riza (Mabille, 1889)
Dalla scylla (Mabille, 1898)
Dalla semiargentea (C. & R. Felder, [1867])
Dalla sepia Evans, 1955
Dalla spica Hayward, 1939
Dalla steinhauseri Freeman, 1991
Dalla superargentea Viloria, Warren & Austin, 2008
Dalla superior Draudt, 1923
Dalla taza Evans, 1955
Dalla thalia Evans, 1955
Dalla vinca Evans, 1955
Dalla wardi Steinhauser, 2002
Dalla xantha Steinhauser, 1991

Former species
Species formerly classified in the genus Dalla include:
 
Dalla bos Steinhauser, 1991 transferred to Ladda bos (Steinhauser, 1991)
Dalla caenides (Hewitson, 1868) transferred to Ladda caenides (Hewitson, 1868)
Dalla calima Steinhauser, 1991 transferred to Ladda calima (Steinhauser, 1991)
Dalla carnis Evans, 1955 transferred to Ladda carnis (Evans, 1955)
Dalla celsus Steinhauser, 2002 transferred to Ladda celsus (Steinhauser, 2002)
Dalla connexa Draudt, 1923 transferred to Ladda connexa (Draudt, 1923)
Dalla crithote (Hewitson, 1874) transferred to Ladda crithote (Hewitson, 1874)
Dalla cuadrada (Weeks, 1901) transferred to Ladda cuadrada (Weeks, 1901)
Dalla cypselides Weeks, 1901 (nom. nud.)
Dalla decca Evans, 1955 transferred to Ladda decca (Evans, 1955)
Dalla disconnexa Steinhauser, 2002 transferred to Ladda disconnexa (Steinhauser, 2002)
Dalla eburones (Hewitson, 1877) transferred to Ladda eburones (Hewitson, 1877)
Dalla granites (Mabille, 1898) transferred to Ladda granites (Mabille, 1898)
Dalla ibhara (Butler, 1870) transferred to Ladda ibhara (Butler, 1870)
Dalla mars Evans, 1955 transferred to Ladda mars (Evans, 1955)
Dalla mora Evans, 1955 transferred to Ladda mora (Evans, 1955)
Dalla monospila (Mabille, 1898) transferred to Ladda monospila (Mabille, 1898)
Dalla morva (Mabille, 1898) transferred to Ladda morva (Mabille, 1898)
Dalla ochrolimbata Draudt, 1923 transferred to Ladda ochrolimbata (Draudt, 1923)
Dalla pantha Evans, 1955 transferred to Ladda pantha (Evans, 1955)
Dalla parma Evans, 1955 transferred to Ladda parma (Evans, 1955)
Dalla pedro Steinhauser, 2002 transferred to Ladda pedro (Steinhauser, 2002)
Dalla plancus (Hopffer, 1874) transferred to Ladda plancus (Hopffer, 1874)
Dalla pura Steinhauser, 1991 transferred to Ladda pura (Steinhauser, 1991)
Dalla puracensis Steinhauser, 1991 transferred to Ladda puracensis (Steinhauser, 1991)
Dalla quadristriga (Mabille, 1889) transferred to Ladda quadristriga (Mabille, 1889)
Dalla roeveri Miller L.D. & J.Y. Miller, 1972 transferred to Piruna roeveri (L.D. Miller & J.Y. Miller, 1972)
Dalla rosea Evans, 1955 transferred to Ladda rosea (Evans, 1955)
Dalla rubia Evans, 1955 transferred to Ladda rubia (Evans, 1955)
Dalla seirocastnia Draudt, 1923 transferred to Ladda seirocastnia (Draudt, 1923)
Dalla simplicis Steinhauser, 1991 transferred to Ladda simplicis (Steinhauser, 1991)
Dalla ticidas (Mabille, 1898) transferred to Ladda ticidas (Mabille, 1898)
Dalla tona Evans, 1955 transferred to Ladda tona (Evans, 1955)
Dalla vista Steinhauser, 2002 transferred to Ladda vista (Steinhauser, 2002)
Dalla xicca (Dyar, 1913) transferred to Ladda xicca (Dyar, 1913)

References

 , 1904, in Wytsman, Gen. Ins. 17B: 107
 , 1999, The Butterflies:  Hedyloidea, Hesperioidea and Papilionoidea. in Lepidoptera, Moths and Butterflies. 1. Evolution, Systematics and Biogeography.  Handbook of Zoology 4(35):263-300 (ed. N. P. Kristensen).  Berlin:  de Gruyter.
 , 1969: Records, new species, and a new genus of Hesperiidae from Mexico (Supplement 2). The Journal of the Lepidopterists' Society 23 (suppl. 2): 1-64. Full article: .
 , 2004, Atlas of Neotropical Lepidoptera; Checklist: Part 4A; Hesperioidea-Papilionoidea.
 , 1992 (1991): Notas sinonímicas sobre Hesperiidae Neotropicais, com descrições de novos géneros, espécies e subespécies (Lepidoptera). Revista Brasileira de Zoologia 7 (4): 503-524. Full article: .
 , 1972: New high-altitude Hesperiinae from Mexico and Ecuador (Hesperiidae). Bull. Allyn Museum 7: 1-7. Full article: 
 , 2002: Five new species of Dalla from Colombia and Ecuador (Hesperiidae). The Journal of the Lepidopterists' Society 56 (1): 53-61. Full article: .
  2008: A spectacular new Dalla Mabille, 1904 from Venezuela-Colombia (Hesperiidae: Heteropterinae). Bulletin of the Alyyn Museum 156: 1-12. Full article .
 , 2011: A new species of Dalla from Chiapas, Mexico (Lepidoptera, Hesperiidae, Heteropterinae). Tropical Lepidoptera Research 21 (1): 7-12.

External links
Natural History Museum Lepidoptera genus database

Heteropterinae
 
Hesperiidae genera